Faculty of Management Studies – University of Delhi (FMS Delhi or The Red Building of Dreams) is a leading business school located in New Delhi, India.  It was established in 1954 under the umbrella of the University of Delhi and is often cited as one of the best business schools in India. The institute was started at the Delhi School of Economics premises under Dean A. Dasgupta of the Delhi College of Engineering (DCE).

The department of commerce of the Delhi College of Engineering (DCE) now, the Delhi Technological University (DTU), was abolished and the Faculty of Management Studies was established.

The first set of professors were trained at the Stanford Graduate School of Business. The institute has since then expanded on the number of management courses available.

Academics 

FMS offers a full-time MBA, an executive MBA, an executive MBA in health care administration and doctoral programmes. In addition to all these programs, FMS also regularly conducts Management Development Programmes.

Admissions
The admission to the course is done on the basis of score in Common Admission Test (CAT) conducted by the Indian Institutes of Management (IIMs). FMS earlier had its own entrance exam which was discontinued starting session 2012–14. For the Doctoral program, the maximum number of Seats is 20. The candidates are required to appear in the entrance test conducted every year in November–December. However, candidates falling under some categories are exempted from appearing in this entrance test. The MBA Executive program has an intake of 159 students, whereas MBA Executive (Health Care Administration) programme has an intake of 39 students.
Recently the admission process has been modified for full-time students wherein CAT weightage is 60%, while remaining is kept for past academic records, group discussions, extempore and personal interviews.

Student Life and Participation

FMS is the only business school which conducts the Management fest (Fiesta) and Cultural & Sports fest (Elysium) separately. For the sports fest, FMS being a part of University of Delhi, has access to the sports facilities of other colleges of Delhi University like Hindu College, University of Delhi, Delhi School of Economics and Shri Ram College of Commerce.

As a Full Time MBA student at FMS, one gets an opportunity to join the Management Science Association (MSA), a completely student run body, which coordinates all these activities. The various societies that form part of MSA at FMS are:
 Alumni Relations Cell - strengthens the relationship with alumni
 Media Relations Cell - serves as the official mouthpiece of the Management Science Association (MSA). Extensive research for surveys and establishing two-way relationship with various media houses are done by them
 Systems Society (SysSoc) - official IT and Operations Management Society)
 Cultural Society (CulSoc) - responsible for managing cultural activities (Intra as well as inter-college)
 Entrepreneurship Cell (E-Cell) - assists students who take up entrepreneurship as a career choice
 Finance Society (FinSoc) - for students that aspire to endorse finance as a career opportunity
 HR & OB Society (HRSoc) - provides students a snapshot of what the corporate world Club activities include a mentorship program, placement preparation, and workshops. 
 The Consulting Club (ConClub) is a student-run organization with the agenda of liaising with Global Consults to increase their presence at FMS while working towards preparing the students for a career in management consulting.
 Scholastic Council (FSC) - acts as a bridge between faculty and the student community and is also an official representative of the college for liaison with international universities.
 Sports Society - conducts Intra FMS sports competition
 Team Fiesta - responsible for the successful conduction of business events
 Vihaan-The Social Service Cell - ensures greater student involvement in the welfare of the community.
Apart from these primary clubs, FMS has voluntary associations like Alpha Investment and Research Club which runs a mutual fund by themselves, Strategy Labs puts forward various live projects and business case studies and Oratory Club aims to improve literary and socio-cultural aspects.

International Associations
As a founding member of the Association of Management Development Institutions of South Asia (AMDISA), FMS has collaborations with the following institutions:

 ESADE, Barcelona, Spain
 INSEAD, Fontainebleau, France
 Katholieke Universiteit Leuven, Leuven, Belgium
 Manchester Business School, England
 Rotterdam School of Management, Erasmus University, Netherlands
 Bielefeld University, Germany
 University of California, Berkeley, Berkeley, USA
 California State University, Fullerton, Fullerton, USA
 University of Wisconsin–Whitewater, White Water, USA

Academic chairs
In 2005, Ministry for Human Resource Development, Govt. Of India has proposed a new chair in the name of the former Indian Prime Minister Rajiv Gandhi, now known as Rajiv Gandhi Chair for Technology Management and Innovation (MHRD, GOI) to promote management of innovation. The Industrial Finance Corporation of India Chair is also one of the professional chairs instituted by industry at FMS.

Rankings

FMS Delhi was ranked 11th in Outlook India "Top Public MBA Institutions" of 2022

Notable alumni

Harit Nagpal, MD & CEO, Tata Sky
Ira Singhal, Indian Civil Services Examination Topper 2014 (conducted by UPSC)
Mahesh Verma, VC of Guru Gobind Singh Indraprastha University
Raghav Bahl, Founding/Controlling Shareholder & Managing Director, Network 18
Sandip Das, Managing Director, Reliance Jio Infocomm
Sat Parashar, Head of the Banking Center at the Bahrain Institute of Banking and Finance, Director at the Indian Institutes of Management, and was also the director of the Indian Institute of Management Indore, India from 2004 to 2008.
Sandeep A. Varma, film director and writer

References

External links
 

Business schools in Delhi
Delhi University
Educational institutions established in 1954
University departments in India
1954 establishments in India